The National Museum of Anthropology is a national museum of Spain, located in Madrid near the Parque del Buen Retiro and opposite Atocha railway and metro station. It is considered the oldest anthropology museum in Spain, formally inaugurated on April 29, 1875, during the reign of Alfonso XII.

History 
Dr Pedro González de Velasco promoted his project of a museum of Anatomy and assembled the early collections.
The focus later passed from physical to cultural anthropology.

Structure 
Each of its three floors is dedicated to a different subject:

 Ground floor. The Asia hall, devoting a special attention to the culture of the Philippines, a Spanish colony until 1898, with many items taken from an 1885 exposition in nearby Retiro Park. It also dedicates side rooms to temporary exhibitions and a cabinet of curiosities giving an impression of the early exhibitions including a plaster cast and the skeleton of the "Extremaduran Giant" (Agustín Luengo Capilla), and statues and plaster casts of several racial types.
 First floor. The Africa hall, with a prominent representation of the culture of Equatorial Guinea, a Spanish colony until 1959.

 Second floor. The Americas hall, covering indigenous peoples of the Americas, with items like Jivaro reduced heads, Andean Carnival masks, and Inuit sun glasses.

A lecture hall allows performances of traditional music and dances and lectures.

References

External links
 Official site
Museo Nacional de Antropología within Google Arts & Culture

Anthropology museums
National museums of Spain
Museums in Madrid
Bien de Interés Cultural landmarks in Madrid
1875 establishments in Spain
Museums established in 1875
Buildings and structures in Jerónimos neighborhood, Madrid